Dream of the Red Chamber (also known as Dream of the Red Mansions) is a 1944 Chinese film directed by Bu Wancang. It is an adaptation of the classic 18th century Qing-era novel by Cao Xueqin.

Cast
Yuan Meiyun as Jia Baoyu (cross-gender acting)
Zhou Xuan as Lin Daiyu
Wang Danfeng as Xue Baochai
Bai Hong as Wang Xifeng
Ouyang Sha-fei as Hua Xiren

External links 

Dream of the Red Chamber at the Chinese Movie Database

1944 films
1944 drama films
Films based on Chinese novels
Chinese black-and-white films
1940s Mandarin-language films
Films directed by Bu Wancang
Works based on Dream of the Red Chamber
Chinese drama films